Omid Khaledi (born 29 October 1988) is an Iranian footballer playing for Sanat Naft Abadan in the Persian Gulf Pro League, is Number 21.

Career
Khaledi made his debut Rah Ahan in a 0-0 draw. He scored his first goal against Mes Kerman. On 25 April 2014, he played the full 90 minutes in an AFC Champions League match against El Jaish SC of Qatar.

Club career statistics

Honours
Foolad
Iran Pro League (1): 2013–14

References

External links
Foolad F.C. profile

1988 births
Foolad FC players
Iranian footballers
Association football defenders
Living people
Mes Rafsanjan players
Saipa F.C. players